This is a list of J/22 sailboat championships.

World championships

International Women's Keelboat Championship 
Reference

References

J/22